The false shark ray (Rhynchorhina mauritaniensis) is a species of fish in the Rhinidae family and the only species in the genus Rhynchorhina. This rare ray is only known from shallow coastal Atlantic waters in Banc d’Arguin, Mauritania.

The upperparts of the false shark ray are greyish or greenish-brown and densely covered in white spots. Overall it resembles the African wedgefish (Rhynchobatus luebberti) found in the same region, but it has a blunt rounded snout somewhat like the shark ray or bowmouth guitarfish (Rhina ancylostoma) of the Indo-Pacific. The genus name Rhynchorhina (Rhyncho+rhina) is a reference to this "mix" of features.

Although long known by the local Imraguen people, the first record confirmed by scientists was in 1998 and it only received its species description in 2016.

Very little is known about the behavior of the false shark ray, but a  female caught in February had ripe ovocytes and shrimp in the stomach, while another had moray eels in the stomach.

References

false shark ray
Fish of the Atlantic Ocean
Fish of West Africa
false shark ray